Pappenheim is a town in Bavaria, Germany.

Pappenheim may also refer to:

Places:
Pappenheim (state), a small state in the Holy Roman Empire
Kleinschmalkalden, a village in Thuringia, called 'Pappenheim' in 1945-1990

People:
Artur Pappenheim (1870–1916), German physician
Bertha Pappenheim (1859–1936), German feminist and humanist
Else Pappenheim (1911-2009), Austrian-American psychiatrist/neurologist, daughter of Martin Pappenheim
Gottfried Heinrich Graf zu Pappenheim (1594–1632), a field marshal of the Holy Roman Emperor
Martin Pappenheim (1881–1943), Austrian psychiatrist-neurologist, a colleague of Sigmund Freud
Solomon Pappenheim (1740–1814), linguist and poet